The Ministry of Foreign Affairs is a Bolivian government ministry which oversees the foreign relations of Bolivia. The minister since 8 November 2020 is Rogelio Mayta.

List of chancellors

Embassies 

 Embassy of Bolivia, London in the United Kingdom
 Embassy of Bolivia, Paris in France
 Embassy of Bolivia, Washington, D.C. in the United States

External links 
  Ministry of Foreign Affairs

Foreign affairs
Foreign relations of Bolivia
Bolivia